Osher Shekalim (born 4 July 1974) is an Israeli Politician currently serving as a Member of the Knesset for Likud.

Biography 
Shekalim was born to Iranian-born parents. He has a master's degree in political communication and a bachelor's degree in political science and sociology, both from Bar-Ilan University. Shekalim ran in Likud primaries ahead of the 2022 Israeli legislative election, competing for the 38th spot on the party's list, reserved for residents of the Tel Aviv area. Shekalim defeated Dor Harlap, a former advisor to Yoav Kisch.

Shekalim was not elected as Likud won 32 seats, but entered the Knesset on 15 February 2023 as a replacement for Eli Cohen, who resigned under the Norwegian Law.

Personal life 
Shekalim resides in Holon. He is married and has four children.

References

External links 

 

Jewish Israeli politicians
Likud politicians
Members of the 25th Knesset (2022–)
Bar-Ilan University alumni
Living people
Year of birth missing (living people)